Naïve New Beaters is a French pop band from Paris.
Their style incorporates elements from rap, rock and electro house. The band was formed in 2005 and found initial internet fame on YouTube in 2007 with the music video for their first single "Bang Bang" eventually receiving over 100,000 views. In May 2009 they released their first album Wallace and toured Europe playing such festivals as Festival Internacional de Benicàssim, Paléo Festival and Osheaga Festival in Quebec, Canada.

Their song "Can't Choose" was featured on the game NBA 2K10.

They are mainly known thanks to their song "Live Good", which was used in a TV commercial for Nokia.

The band released their second studio album 'La Onda' on the 24 September 2012.
On 24 and 25 June 2013, the band were the support-act for The Smashing Pumpkins in Paris and Nantes.

Discography

Albums
Wallace (2009)
La Onda (24 September 2012)
À la folie (2016)

Singles
"Live Good" (2007)
"Bang Bang" (2007)
"Get Love" (2009)
"Just Another Day" (2010)
"Jersey" (2012)
"La onda" (2012)
"Shit Happens" (2013)
"Heal Tomorrow" featuring Izia (2016)

References

French pop music groups
Musical groups from Paris